The 2009 Presidents Cup was held October 8–11, 2009 at the Harding Park Golf Club in San Francisco, California. The United States team won the golf competition by a margin of  their second consecutive win by that exact score and third in a row overall. This was also the sixth outright win for the U.S. Team in eight meetings, with one International win in 1998 and one tied match in 2003.

Format
The first day of competition featured six foursomes matches. On the second day, six matches of four-ball were played. This was followed on Day 3 by five morning foursomes matches and five afternoon four-ball matches. On the fourth and final day, twelve singles matches were played, for a total of 34 matches in the competition.

The final day was conducted under a special rule that differed slightly from that used in other team competitions such as the Ryder Cup. Singles matches ending halved after the regulation 18 holes were to be extended to extra holes until an outright winner was determined. This format was used until one team earned the 17 points needed to win the Cup outright, at which time all remaining matches were only played to the regulation 18 holes and could be halved.

No matches went to extra holes in the 2009 competition. The first match on the final day in which all 18 holes were played was the Mike Weir–Justin Leonard match, which finished all square after 18. At that time, the U.S. Team was leading 17–10, which meant that the match should have continued. However, at the same time, the Y.E. Yang–Tiger Woods match was at the 13th hole with Woods 5 up. Instead of immediately going to the first hole to continue their match, Weir and Leonard watched the Yang–Woods match on a nearby giant screen. When Woods sank the putt that gave him a 6 and 5 victory and gave the U.S. an insurmountable 18–10 lead, Weir and Leonard, seeing that the outcome of the Cup was no longer in doubt, agreed to halve their match.

Teams
Both teams had 12 players plus a non-playing captain. Members of the U.S. Team were selected based on earnings from the 2007 Wyndham Championship through the 2009 PGA Championship. International Team players were chosen on the basis of the Official World Golf Ranking through the 2009 PGA Championship. The International Team does not include players eligible for the European Ryder Cup Team. The top 10 players from each list made their respective teams and the captains choose the remaining two players.

OWGR as of October 5, 2009, the last ranking before the Cup

Thursday's matches
All matches were foursomes.

Friday's matches
All matches were in four-ball format.

Saturday's matches

Morning foursomes

Afternoon four-ball

Sunday's matches
All matches featured were in singles competition.

Individual player records
Each entry refers to the win–loss–half record of the player.

United States

International

Notes and references

External links
Official scores
ESPN Scores

Presidents Cup
Golf in California
Sports competitions in San Francisco
Presidents Cup
Presidents Cup
Presidents Cup
Presidents Cup